Lisette Pia Hee Young Pagler, (born 5 January 1981) is a South-Korean-Swedish musical singer and actress, best known internationally for her role as an intelligent android in the TV series Real Humans.

Early life 
Pagler grew up in Nättraby, and was educated at the ballet academy's musical department in Gothenburg. She got her big break after winning Sveriges Television talent show Jakten på Julia, in which the winner won the female lead in the musical Romeo and Juliet (based on the Shakespeare play), opposite singer Måns Zelmerlöw.

Career 
Pagler is a mezzo-soprano singer, and in 2004 she took part in the musical Stoppa världen! – Jag vill kliva av.  She reunited with Måns Zelmerlöw for the season finale of Allsång på Skansen in August 2010.  Since 2012, Pagler has played Mimi/Anita, a hubot (robot that looks human), as a main cast member in the science fiction television series Äkta Människor (Real Humans), which is broadcast on SVT.  She has also had roles in the musicals Cats and Singin' in the Rain.

Filmography

References

External links

1981 births
Living people
South Korean emigrants to Sweden
Swedish film actresses
Swedish musical theatre actresses
Swedish television actresses
21st-century Swedish actresses
21st-century Swedish singers
21st-century Swedish women singers